Andrus Saare (born on 29 December 1965) is an Estonian politician. He was a member of XII Riigikogu.

Before becoming a member of the Riigikogu, Saare was the mayor of Kohila Parish from 1999 to 2005, and again from 2009 to 2011. He was a member of Pro Patria and Res Publica Union.

References

Living people
1965 births
Pro Patria Union politicians
Members of the Riigikogu, 2011–2015
Mayors of places in Estonia
People from Kohila Parish